Paul Sæthrang (19 July 1918 – 5 August 1994) was a Norwegian football striker.

His son Pål Sæthrang was also capped for Norway. They were the second father-son combination to be capped, after Rolf Pedersen and Rolf Birger Pedersen.

Paul Sæthrang played for Skeid between 1937 and 1951, except for the war years 1941 to 1945, becoming cup champion in 1948. He represented Norway as a B and senior international.

References

1918 births
1994 deaths
People from Tinn
Norwegian footballers
Skeid Fotball players
Norway international footballers
Association football forwards
Sportspeople from Vestfold og Telemark